Orientocreadiidae is a family of trematodes belonging to the order Plagiorchiida.

Genera:
 Macrotrema Gupta, 1951
 Orientocreadium Tubangui, 1931

References

Plagiorchiida